Port Moody Secondary School is a public coeducational high school located in Port Moody, British Columbia. The school offers the International Baccalaureate Program and the Career Preparation Program to its students. There are approximately 400 students in the pre-International Baccalaureate Diploma programme and the International Baccalaureate diploma programme tracks.  Port Moody serves grades nine through twelve and has an enrollment of about 1,500 students as of January 2019. The school is respected for its academics, visual arts, musical arts and athletic programs.

History
The original Port Moody High School, which was located on the grounds of the current Moody Middle School, burned to the ground in 1969. A site was chosen for the new Port Moody Senior Secondary School, which opened in 1973. A mythological bird that rises from the ashes, "The Phoenix", was appropriately chosen as the school's new mascot. The team name selected was the Port Moody Blues. Built to accommodate 900 students, Port Moody Secondary has grown to a population of well over 1 300 and a staff of about 100. From 2000-2002, the school underwent renovation; the new three-story tower and gymnasium addition was completed. Enrollment at the school has dropped in recent years, due in part to the changing demographics of the neighbourhood it is located in. Port Moody also used to offer the Cambridge Latin Course.

Extracurricular activities

Port Moody is home to numerous extracurricular clubs. The Student Council hosts events to benefit the school in many ways, including the annual Spring Fling and school dance. The school is also home to the PMSS Leadership Committee which hosts the annual Talent Show and has a comprehensive leadership program called SOAR. Humanitarian groups include Red Cross, UNICEF, Community Leadership Force, and MSF (Doctors Without Borders). The Debate Team has competed at the regional, provincial and national levels, winning the regional championship in 2012 and 2013, later coming 3rd overall in the country. Their debate team has also produced three national team members, who have gone on to win several international competitions. The school also has an Improv Team which takes yearly involvement in the Canadian Improv Games.

Clubs

Amnesty International Club
Art Club
Investment Club
Community Leadership Force (CLF)
Chess Club
Debate Team
Experimentational 3D
First Steps
French Club
GSA (Global Societal Acceptance) 
Graphic Design and Marketing Club
Improv Club
International Education Club
Kindlers Society
Litter Critters
Green Team
Math Competition Club
Model United Nations
MSF - Doctors Without Borders
Odyssey of the Mind
Photography Club 
Ping Pong Club
PMSS Busking Group
PMSS Roots
PMSS E-Sports
Programming Contest Club
Red Cross Youth Action Group
Reach for the Top Club
Red Cross 
Robotics Club
SUMAC (Students Making a Change)
Tabletop Games Club
Team & Team International
Teens Transforming the Community (T3C)
World Vision
PMSS History
Games Club
UNICEF

Committees

Student Council
Blues Spirit Crew
Yearbook Committee
SOAR 
Peer Tutoring 
Prom Committee
The Blueprint School Newspaper

Athletics
Port Moody has many well-established sports teams. The cheer-leading team has achieved an average standard of excellence in competition in both Canada and the United States, the senior cheer team having won the national champion title in 2007.  The girls rugby team has also achieved an average standard of excellence, placing provincially for many years: 6th in 2007, 4th in 2008, 2nd in 2009, and 6th in 2010. The rugby teams have also competed in England and Australia. The senior boys soccer team won the provincial championship in 2007.

Sports teams

Basketball- Junior/Senior Boys
Badminton
Cheerleading 
Cross country
Field hockey- Girls
Golf
Hockey
Lacrosse
Rugby- Boys & Girls
Ski & Snowboard Club
Soccer
Swimming
Table tennis
Tennis
Track and field
Volleyball
Wrestling
Ultimate Frisbee

Music
Port Moody has an arts program that runs the community jazz and concert bands. The school's concert band, jazz bands, vocal jazz and concert choir ensembles have competed at provincial or national levels, and the school has a multi-station MIDI lab and recording studio for the music technology courses offered. Port Moody is also the only school in the district that offers advanced art programs.

Music groups

Concert Band (Junior Band)
Community Band (Senior Band)
Jazz Band (Junior, Intermediate, and Senior)
String Orchestra
Concert Choir
Vocal Jazz
Rock School Band

Dance
Port Moody also both a Junior and Senior Competitive dance team that has won multiple awards for their standard of excellence.

Notable alumni
Doug Brown, former NFLer and CFLer
Corey Mace, NFLer
Three members of The Nervous Fellas Al Black, Butch Murphy, Chris Colt
Fred Ewanuick, actor
Ronald Lam, figure skater
Cassidy Civet, musician and performer
Omar Sachedina, Canadian journalist

References

High schools in British Columbia
International Baccalaureate schools in British Columbia
Buildings and structures in Port Moody
Educational institutions in Canada with year of establishment missing